How I Quit Smoking is the second studio album by the American rock band Lambchop, released on January 30, 1996, by Merge Records.

The song "The Man Who Loved Beer" is an adaptation of the poem "The Man Who Was Tired of Life" from the ancient Egyptian text Dispute between a man and his Ba (c. 2000–1700 BC). The song was in turn later covered by David Byrne.

Track listing

Personnel 
Sourced from AllMusic.

Lambchop
 Kurt Wagner - vocals, guitar, classical guitar, electric guitar
 Paul Niehaus - double neck guitar
 John Delworth - Farfisa and Hammond organs
 Jonathan Marx - clarinet, cornet, alto sax, vocals
 Deanna Varagona - alto and baritone saxophones, vocals
 Allen Lowrey - drums

References

1996 albums
Lambchop (band) albums
Merge Records albums